Guomao station may refer to:

Guomao station (Beijing Subway), a station on Line 1 and Line 10 of the Beijing Subway
Guomao station (Shenzhen Metro), a station on Line 1 of the Shenzhen Metro